Upendra Rao (known mononymously as Upendra; born 18 September 1968) is an Indian actor, filmmaker, producer, screenwriter and politician who works primarily in Kannada films. Upendra has also worked in a few Telugu films. Upendra is known for his thematic representation of Indian politics and society in his films. In October 2017, He joined the political party Karnataka Pragnyavanta Janata Paksha, before quitting the party in March 2018 due to internal differences and formed another party named Uttama Prajakeeya Party (UPP), which is based on the principles of Prajakiya (citizen-centric administration). He received an Honorary Doctorate from Angkor University in 2015.

He started his film career as a writer and an assistant director with actor and film director Kashinath. His first directorial venture was Tharle Nan Maga (1992). In the mid-1990s, Upendra directed Om, followed by A, in which he debuted as an actor. His next film Upendra starred Raveena Tandon. After a decade of acting in Kannada and several Telugu films, he returned to directing with Kannada film Super, which was well-received critically and commercially.

Upendra is known for his work in films such as A (1998), Upendra (1999), Preethse (2000), Super Star (2002), Kutumba (2002), Gokarna (2002), Hollywood (2002), Raktha Kanneeru (2003), Gowramma (2005), Aishwarya (2006), Anatharu (2007), Budhivanta (2008), Super (2010), Kalpana (2012), Godfather (2012),  S/O Satyamurthy (2015), Uppi 2 (2015), I Love You (2019).

Early life 
Upendra was born to Manjunath Rao and Anusuya in Bengaluru, on 18 September 1968. His father was from Thekkatte, Koteshwara, Kundapur Taluk, Udupi district in Karnataka, formerly Mysore State. He is the second son of his family; his older brother is Sudheendra Rao. Rao's family was poor. As a baby, he had an eye problem, the result of which can be seen when he rolls his eyeballs in many film sequences. He obtained his Bachelor of Commerce degree from APS College of Commerce, Bangalore. During his time at the college, he participated in plays and often formed troupes with his friends. His association with actor and director Kashinath, a distant relative of his, began during his final year in college.

Film career

As a director 
He assisted director Kashinath in various departments apart from assisting in writing songs, dialogues, and screenplay for his movies. He co-directed a film with Kashinath. He started as a director with a typical Kashinath style comedy called Tharle Nan Maga in 1992. The film introduced famed comedian Jaggesh. The movie went on to be a success and has since achieved a cult following.

Upendra directed a horror suspense thriller next called Shhh! in 1993. The film featured Kashinath and a young producer and actor named Kumar Govind. The film was a major box office success, and Upendra came out as an independent director.

His next film was a gangster film called Om, which was released in 1995. The film starred Shivrajkumar and cast real gangsters in its cast. Om became a blockbuster and went on to be one of the highest-grossing Kannada films of its time and made news at a national level. Upendra became an overnight star director. With Om, Upendra again reunited actress Prema with Shivanna earlier they had acted in a film called Savyasachi. Om was also remade into several languages – the Hindi version was called Arjun Pandit and had Sunny Deol playing Shivrajkumar's role.

Upendra turned towards a project to direct an extended version of the 1981 film Antha and called it Operation Antha. The film had Ambareesh reprise his role from Antha as Kanwar Lal. The film was not very successful; it was also controversial for its taunts on some real-life political figures.

In 1998, Upendra directed A, through which he made a successful transition to acting. There were rumors that it was Upendra's own story, and the actress in the film portrayed his protege Prema. This added to the film's popularity and it broke many box office records upon release and went on to become one of the highest grossing Kannada films of its time. The film had a 175-day run in Karnataka was also dubbed to Telugu, and repeated its success in Andhra Pradesh too, where it had a 100-day run. The film won accolades from Bollywood personalities like Amitabh Bachchan and Anil Kapoor. Upendra was now a big name in Kannada cinema and was also popular in Andhra Pradesh.

Upendra's next movie was Swasthik with lead Raghavendra Rajkumar, which was released in 1998. The film performed averagely at the box office but critically well received.

In 1999, Upendra made a self-titled film, Upendra. Upendra acted in this film as the unnamed protagonist (or antagonist) Naanu (I or Myself). The film starred three heroines: Damini, Prema, and Bollywood actress Raveena Tandon. Naanu was an arrogant character and was very demeaning towards women, bordering on misogyny; which led to a lot of criticism on the film. However, the film broke many box office records and went on to be a much bigger hit than A in both Karnataka and Andhra Pradesh. The film had a 200-day run in Karnataka, and its Telugu version had a 100-day run in Andhra Pradesh. Upendra was now not only a remarkably successful director, but also a big star with a large fan base in Karnataka and Andhra Pradesh. Since then, Upendra gave up directing and concentrated more on his acting career.

Upendra came back as a director after 10 years in 2010 with the movie Super. The movie was released in a record number of theatres all over Karnataka, was dubbed in Telugu, and released in Andhra Pradesh. Super was a blockbuster, breaking many box office records upon release and had a 175-day theatrical run, becoming one of the highest-grossing and critically acclaimed Kannada films of 2010.

In 2011, Tamil actor Rajinikanth attended a private screening of Super in Bangalore. Rajinikanth watched the film along with Upendra and a couple of friends. "Upendra is a great actor and director. There is hardly anyone in Indian Cinema, who would think like him. Only he can think like that. I like watching Upendra's films, and this was no exception. If I get an opportunity and an impressive script, I'd like to act in a Upendra film in the future," said Rajini.

In 2015, Upendra directed and starred in a sequel to his 1999 film Upendra, titled Uppi 2. As it was a sequel to Upendra and his comeback as a director after 5 years, expectations and the resulting hype was high before it released. The film was simultaneously released in Karnataka, Andhra Pradesh, and the US in over 600 theaters. Upon release, the film set records for the highest grossing opening day for a Kannada movie. Although the film got mixed responses because of its confusing storyline and screenplay, it was commercially successful and profitable with a 50-day theatrical run. It sold the second-highest number of tickets in online ticket sales on Bookmyshow among Kannada movies in 2015. It was also successful outside of India and became the second-highest-grossing Kannada film of all time in US.

On 3 June 2022, 7 years after Uppi 2, Upendra launched his next directorial, UI.

In IMDb's list of Best 50 Directors of the World, Upendra holds the 17th place.

Acting career

Cameo appearances 
Upendra first appeared on screen making an appearance in Kashinath's 1989 comedy film, Anantana Avantara. He appeared as Lord Kamadeva in the song "Come On Come On Kaamanna". In Ajagajantara, also directed by Kashinath, he made a cameo appearance. In his directorial debut, Shhh! (1993), Upendra made another cameo appearance, like a mad man in the attire of a police officer barging into a film set. In his 1995 directorial Operation Antha, he appears as a man urinating on a roadside wall and explains of India's ways to a complaining Mandakini (played by Sangeetha).

1998–2005 
From 1998 to 2005, Upendra starred in eight 100 days hits in eight years, such as A, Upendra, Preethse, Kutumba, Raktha Kanneeru, Gokarna, Gowramma and Auto Shankar.

In 1998, Upendra directed and starred in A, which was his fifth film as a director but his first lead role as a hero. The film had a 175-day run and became a trend-setting blockbuster in Karnataka, with its Telugu dubbed version running for 100 days in Andhra Pradesh. Around this time, he received an offer from Amitabh Bachchan Corporation to make a film for them, which did not materialize. Due to Upendra's newly found popularity in Telugu, Telugu director E. V. V. Satyanarayana cast him in the 1998 Telugu film Kanyadanam alongside Srikanth and Rachana, which also became a commercial success. In 1999 Upendra again directed and starred in his self-titled film Upendra which starred Bollywood actress Raveena Tandon. The film went on to become a bigger hit than A, both in Karnataka as well as in Andhra Pradesh. The film had a 200 days run in Karnataka and 100 days run in Andhra Pradesh. In 2000, Upendra starred opposite Bollywood actress Sonali Bendre in the psychological thriller Preethse which was a remake of Bollywood film Darr. Preethse became Upendra's third consecutive blockbuster that ran for 175 days. With three back-to-back highly received films, Upendra became well known in the Kannada and Telugu film industries. In 2001 Upendra wrote and starred in a Telugu film titled Raa, which became a box office hit in Andhra Pradesh. Raa was a typical Upendra style film in which he plays a womanizing playboy. Upendra starred opposite his future wife Priyanka Trivedi for the first time in this film.

In 2002, Upendra acted in less-received films such as H2O, Super Star, Hollywood, Nagarahavu and Naanu Naane for not meeting expectations and having average run at the box office.

From 2003 to 2005 he starred in 5 back-to-back films that each ran for 100 days such as Kutumba, Raktha Kanneeru, Gokarna, Gowramma, and Auto Shankar; all of which were well received at the box office. Only two films of Upendra in this time were received poorly: Omkara and News.

2006–2009 
Upendra had a less successful phase from 2006 to 2009, as most of his films during this period went unnoticed at the box office such as Uppi Dada M.B.B.S., Tandege Takka Maga, Parodi, Masti, Toss (Telugu), Lava Kusha, Sathyam (Tamil), Dubai Babu and Rajini.

The only commercial well-received films he acted in during this period were the candy floss romantic comedy Aishwarya, which ran for 75 days, and the moderately successful Anatharu which ran for 70 days. Upendra received praise and critical acclaim for his performance in Anatharu.

Budhivanta, which was Upendra's only release in 2008, was considered as his big comeback. The film was declared a blockbuster and ran for 100 days; it became the top box office grosser of the year. Budhivantas Telugu dub was also well-received and ran for 50 days in Andhra Pradesh.

2010–present 

2010 marked Upendra's comeback to directing after 10 years. After several ups and downs in his acting career, Upendra came back to direct and act in the 2010 film Super in which he starred alongside Tamil actress Nayantara and Tulip Joshi. The movie was released in a record number of theatres all over Karnataka and was also dubbed into Telugu and released in Andhra Pradesh. Super broke many box office records upon release and completing 175 days of the run, becoming one of the highest-grossing critically acclaimed Kannada films of 2010.

Upendra then starred in films like Shrimathi (2011) opposite his wife Priyanka Trivedi and Bollywood actress Celina Jaitly, and Aarakshaka (2012). In 2012, Upendra starred in several commercially successful films such as 3D fantasy film Katari Veera Surasundarangi which was well-received and became the second-highest-grossing film of the year, followed by Godfather which performed above average, and the horror-comedy film Kalpana which performed average at the box office.

Upendra's films from 2013 to 2015 such as Topiwala (2013), Brahma (2014), Super Ranga (2014) and Shivam (2015) performed poorly in theatres.

In 2015, Upendra starred alongside Allu Arjun in the Telugu film S/O Satyamurthy that was directed by Trivikram Srinivas. The film was declared a hit, grossing 92 crores and netting over 60 crores at the global box office, becoming the seventh-highest-grossing Telugu film of all time worldwide.

In 2016, Upendra starred in a sequel to his earlier hit horror film Kalpana titled as Kalpana 2 which became an average grosser at the box office. He also starred along with Sudeep in the remake of Bollywood film OMG titled as Mukunda Murari, which became a box office success and had a 50-day run.

Upcoming projects 
Upendra's upcoming films include a Soggade Chinni Nayana remake titled Upendra Matte Baa, Inti Ninna Prema, Kanneshwara, Uppi Rupee, his 50th film directed by Masterpiece director Manju Mandavya, a film directed and produced by Shashank, and Dr. Modi directed by Uday Prakash. In May 2019 he finished principal photography for Buddhivantha-2.

Upendra's upcoming movie 'Ghani', directed by Kiran Korrapati. The movie also stars Varun Tej, Saiee Manjrekar, Suniel Shetty, Jagapathi Babu and Naveen Chandra.

Political career 

He started the political party Uttama Prajakeeya Party in 2018, under the concept of "Prajakeeya"which represents the workers. Although he has strictly kept himself away from contesting in any elections, UPP had candidates across all the constituencies in Karnataka in the 2019 Lok Sabha Elections.

Craft and style 
Upendra's films have been praised and criticized for their unusual plotlines and screenplay. During a radio interview, Upendra expressed his disappointment at being labeled as a "different director" and explained that most of his directorial ventures deal with the things that he had undergone in his real life. He said, in regards to his non-linear narrative, that "when one wants to capture the upheavals in one's mind, it becomes a jumble. Our mind is like that, always confused."

The subject of the films coupled with Uppi's novel approach made headlines for mixed reasons. Upendra added that in his self-titled film he explored human nature which "ended with “Aham Brahmaasmi", where I wanted to say rise above I."

Personal life

Family

On 14 December 2003, Upendra married actress and former Miss Kolkata Priyanka Trivedi, who first starred opposite him in the Telugu movie Raa and then in H2O. Upendra and his family now resides in Bangalore.

Endorsements 
Upendra has endorsed a number of brands. Upendra has been the brand ambassador of the United Breweries, Lunars Footwear, SK Super TMT, Royal Challengers Bangalore (replaced by Puneeth Rajkumar in IPL 3), Mavalli Tiffin Room (MTR), Bangalore Electricity Supply Company, Emani Navaratna Brand, Karnataka Milk Federation (Nandini), Udayavani News Daily.

Awards and nominations 

 Other honours
 2015 Honorary Doctorate from Angkor University

See also 
List of actor-politicians

References

External links 

 Upendra at Youtube
 

Living people
21st-century Indian film directors
Kannada film directors
Telugu film directors
Male actors in Kannada cinema
Male actors in Telugu cinema
Male actors in Tamil cinema
20th-century Indian male actors
21st-century Indian male actors
Filmfare Awards South winners
Kannada playback singers
People from Udupi district
Indian male playback singers
Male actors from Bangalore
Film directors from Bangalore
Kannada screenwriters
Indian lyricists
Kannada-language lyricists
Indian male film actors
Singers from Bangalore
Screenwriters from Bangalore
Indian actor-politicians
Madhva Brahmins
1968 births